Amblyodipsas rodhaini, commonly known as Rodhain's purple-glossed snake, is a species of venomous rear-fanged snake in the family Atractaspididae. The species is endemic to the Democratic Republic of the Congo.

Etymology
Both the specific name, rodhaini, and the common name, Rodhain's purple-glossed snake, are in honor of Belgian physician and zoologist Jérome Alphonse Hubert Rodhain (1876–1956).

Reproduction
A. rodhaini is oviparous.

References

Further reading
de Witte GF (1930). "Un serpent du Congo Belge (Rhinocalamus rhodaini sp. n.)". Revue de zoologie et de botanique africaines 19 (1): 1-3. (Rhinocalamus rhodaini [sic], new species). (in French).
de Witte GF, Laurent RF (1947). "Revision de une groupe de Colubridae africains: genres Calamelaps, Miodon, Aparallactus, et formes affines ". Mémoires du Musée Royal d'Histoire Naturelle de Belgique, Série Deuxième 29: 1-134. (Calamelaps rodhaini, new combination). (in French).
Branch, Bill (2014). A Photographic Guide to Snakes other Reptiles and Amphibians of East Africa, New Edition. Cape Town: Random House Struik. 160 pp. . (Amblyodipsas rodhaini, p. 67).

Atractaspididae
Snakes of Africa
Reptiles of the Democratic Republic of the Congo
Endemic fauna of the Democratic Republic of the Congo
Taxa named by Gaston-François de Witte
Reptiles described in 1930